"Roulette" is a piano instrumental by Russ Conway. 

It was the second and final of his two No. 1 hits in the UK Singles Chart, the first being "Side Saddle".

References

1959 singles
1959 songs
1950s instrumentals
Columbia Graphophone Company singles